Kinnear is an unincorporated community in central Fremont County, Wyoming, United States.  It lies along the concurrent U.S. Highways 26 and 287 at their intersection with Wyoming Highway 133, northwest of the city of Riverton and north of the city of Lander, the county seat of Fremont County.  Its elevation is 5,400 feet (1,646 m). Kinnear has a post office, with the ZIP code of 82516.

Public education in the community of Kinnear is provided by Fremont County School District #6.

References

Unincorporated communities in Fremont County, Wyoming
Unincorporated communities in Wyoming